Johannes Hendrik Kramers (26 February 1891 in Rotterdam – 17 December 1951 in Oegstgeest) was a Dutch scholar of Islamic studies and ottomanist.

External links 
 Website Leiden University

Sources
 

1891 births
1951 deaths
20th-century Dutch historians
Writers from Rotterdam
Dutch Islamic studies scholars